Pietro De Martino or Di Martino (31 May 1707 – 28 January 1746) was an Italian mathematician and astronomer.

Biography 
Born in Faicchio, he was brother of Angelo, professor first of medical physics then of mathematics at the University of Naples; and of Nicola Antonio De Martino, professor di mathematics and director of the Real Corpo degli Ingegneri (Royal Engineers Corp) and Marine Guard. Pietro De Martino was a pupil of Agostino Ariani and of Giacinto De Cristoforo (1650-1730). In 1735 he was assigned of the astronomical and nautical chair at the University of Naples.

He disputed with Roger Joseph Boscovich on the question if it is possible to gain a right result starting from a wrong hypothesis.

He authored various works; his Nuove istituzioni di aritmetica pratica, published originally in 1739 in Naples, had many reprints (the better known of the 1758; one also in Turin in 1762). He died in Naples in 1746.

Works

References 

1707 births
1746 deaths
18th-century Italian astronomers
18th-century Italian mathematicians
People from the Province of Benevento
Scientists from Naples
Academic staff of the University of Naples Federico II